Rebecca Zadig (born July 27, 1982) is a Swedish singer․

Career 
Rebecca Zadig was featured in Arash's song "Temptation". This song is a newer version of her own song "Temptation" which also featured Arash (then known as 'Alex'). Lyrics of the two songs differ considerably. While Rebecca's song is in English with a solo by Arash in Persian, Arash's version is a Persian song with an English chorus.

Rebecca Zadig also sang in the  song "Bombay Dreams" with Aneela in 2004 and has been featured in "Mitarsam" (also called "Suddenly") - singles from Arash.

In live performances of Arash, for example the one he did on "Live in Sopot" at the Polish television, and in others, Rebecca Zadig sang the song with Arash, although the recorded version of the song "Arash" is normally sung by Helena (who does not appear in public).

She also works in fashion and underwear design.

Discography

Singles

As lead artist

As featured artist

Songs

As lead artist

As featured artist

References 

Swedish pop singers
Singers from Malmö
1982 births
Living people
21st-century Swedish singers
21st-century Swedish women singers